3 Man Island were an English electronic music trio best known for their song "Jack The Lad" which charted in the United States and the United Kingdom. The band recorded three songs together. The songs are "Funkin' for the UK" (which featured the vocals of Carol Jiani), "Jack The Lad", and "Horror House". The band never released a full-length studio album.

Singles

References

British synth-pop groups
British house music groups
Musical groups from London